Zelleria plumbeella is a moth of the family Yponomeutidae. It is found in Spain.

The moth's typical adult wingspan is 19–21 mm.

References

Moths described in 1871
Yponomeutidae